Al Capone (1899–1947) is one of the most notorious American gangsters of the 20th century and has been the major subject of numerous articles, books, and films. Particularly, from 1925 to 1929, shortly after Capone relocated to Chicago, he enjoyed status as the most notorious mobster in the country. Capone cultivated a certain image of himself in the media, that made him a subject of fascination. His personality and character have been used in fiction as a model for crime lords and criminal masterminds ever since his death. The stereotypical image of a mobster wearing a pinstriped suit and tilted fedora are based on photos of Capone. His accent, mannerisms, facial construction, physical stature, and parodies of his name have been used for numerous gangsters in comics, movies, music, and literature.

Literature
 Capone is featured in a segment of Mario Puzo's The Godfather as an ally of New York mob boss Salvatore Maranzano in which he sends two "button men" at the mob boss' request to kill Don Vito Corleone; arriving in New York, the two men are intercepted and brutally killed by Luca Brasi, after which Don Corleone sends a message to Capone warning him not to interfere again, and Capone apparently capitulates.
 Capone appears in Hergé's comic book Tintin in America, one of only two real-life characters in the entire The Adventures of Tintin series.
 A reincarnated Capone is a major character in science fiction author Peter F. Hamilton's Night's Dawn Trilogy.
 Capone's grandniece Deirdre Marie Capone wrote a book titled Uncle Al Capone: The Untold Story from Inside His Family.
 Al Capone is the inspiration for the central character of Tony Camonte in Armitage Trail's novel Scarface (1929), which was adapted into the 1932 film. The novel was later adapted again into the 1983 film with the central character of Tony Montana, by moving the action to then-present-day Miami.
 Jack Bilbo claimed to have been a bodyguard for Capone in his book Carrying a Gun for Al Capone (1932).
 Al Capone is mentioned and met by the main character Moose in the book Al Capone Does My Shirts.
 A fictional alternate universe version of Al Capone is the second leader of a communist version of the United States known as the United Socialist States of America (USSA) in the alternate history book Back in the USSA by Eugene Byrne and Kim Newman. In the alternate universe depicted in the book, it was America instead of Russia that had a communist revolution in 1917 with Russia under the control of a democratic version of the Russian Empire as a rival of the USSA in this timeline's version of the Cold War. Many characters (consisting of real historical figures and characters from other fictional works) and events in Back in the USSA are parallel to those in real life with the USSA as the equivalent of the Soviet Union. Capone becomes leader of the Socialist Party of America and the USSA in 1926 after the death of the Party leader and regime's founder, Eugene V. Debs. Just as Debs was the equivalent of Vladimir Lenin, Capone was the equivalent of Joseph Stalin who was Soviet leader after Lenin's death. Capone ruled as a Stalinesque tyrant with widespread repression, a cult of personality based around himself as well as the exile of political opponents and includes the timeline's own version of Stalin's Great Purge where Capone directs the regime to kill his Party rivals. Just as with Stalin, Capone dies in office and replaced by Barry Goldwater who is depicted as a Nikita Khrushchev type reformist.
 Another fictional alternate universe version of Al Capone is featured in the short story Boss by Mark Bourne in the alternate history anthology, Alternate Tyrants. The short story is written in the style of a Studs Terkel oral history. In it, the fictional version of Terkel narrates that Capone, after seeing a chance astronomical event, decides to start a political career. Capone is eventually elected President of the United States and starts a Mafia-like presidency that lasts for several decades.
 Yet another fictional alternate universe version of Capone is found in the alternate history short story Next Year in Prague by Barbara Newman. This story depicts him as the gangster he was in real life though he dies through different circumstances than in reality. This story's timeline diverges from our own when Anton Cermak was not assassinated in 1933 but instead survived and not only remains Mayor of Chicago but gets elected to several more terms. During that time, Cermak wages a campaign against Chicago's gangsters, including Capone. Cermak goes as far as risking his own life be personally talking part in police raids. Evidence found during that campaign led to Capone's conviction on seven charges of murder (in real life, Capone was highly suspected of such crimes but the courts were unable to prove it beyond the reasonable doubt required by the law and instead jailed him for proven tax evasion in 1931) and executed in 1938. As a result of Capone's conviction, Cermak was now very popular nationally to the point that in the 1940s, the "Cermak Amendment" was enacted, amending the US Constitution to remove the Natural-born-citizen requirement for president and vice-president to allow Czech-born Cermak to run those positions, which does transpire later in the story.

Film and television
Capone has been portrayed on screen by:
 Rod Steiger in Al Capone (1959)
 Neville Brand in the TV series The Untouchables and again in the film The George Raft Story (1961)
 José Calvo in Due mafiosi contro Al Capone (1966)
 Jason Robards in The St. Valentine's Day Massacre (1967)
 Ben Gazzara in Capone (1975)
 Robert De Niro in Brian De Palma's Eliot Ness biopic The Untouchables (1987)
 Ray Sharkey in The Revenge of Al Capone (1989)
 Eric Roberts in The Lost Capone (1990)
 Titus Welliver in Mobsters (1991)
 Bernie Gigliotti in The Babe (1992), in a brief scene in a Chicago nightclub during which Capone and his mentor Johnny Torrio, played by Guy Barile, meet the film's main character Babe Ruth, portrayed by John Goodman.
 William Forsythe in The Untouchables (1993–1994)
 William Devane in Lois & Clark: The New Adventures of Superman, season 2, episode 7: "That Old Gang of Mine" (1994)
 F. Murray Abraham in Dillinger and Capone (1995)
 Anthony LaPaglia in Road to Perdition (2002), in a deleted scene
 Julian Littman in Al's Lads (2002)
 Jon Bernthal in Night at the Museum: Battle of the Smithsonian (2009)
 Stephen Graham in all seasons of the HBO series Boardwalk Empire (2010–2014)
 Jason Jones in Fugget About It, season 1, episode 8: "Al Capone Wears Ladies Underwear" (2012)
 Isaac Keoughan in Legends of Tomorrow (2016)
 Michael Kotsohilis in The Making of the Mob: Chicago (2016)
 Cameron Gharaee in Timeless (2017)
 Milo Gibson in Gangster Land (2017)
 Tom Hardy in Josh Trank's biopic Capone (2020)

Actors playing characters based on Capone include:
 Wallace Beery as Louis "Louie" Scorpio in The Secret Six (1931)
 Ricardo Cortez as Goldie Gorio in Bad Company (1931)
 Paul Lukas as Big Fellow Maskal in City Streets (1931)
 Edward Arnold as Duke Morgan in Okay, America! (1932)
 Jean Hersholt as Samuel "Sam" Belmonte in The Beast of the City (1932)
 Paul Muni as Antonio "Tony" Camonte in Scarface (1932)
 C. Henry Gordon as Nick Diamond in Gabriel Over the White House (1933)
 John Litel as "Gat" Brady in Alcatraz Island (1937)
 Barry Sullivan as Shubunka in The Gangster (1947)
 Edward G. Robinson as Johnny Rocco in Key Largo (1948)
 Ralph Volkie as Big Fellow in The Undercover Man (1949)
 Edmond O'Brien as Fran McCarg in Pete Kelly's Blues (1955)
 B.S. Pully as Big Jule, an intimidating, gun-toting mobster from "East Cicero, Illinois" in the film adaptation of Guys and Dolls (1955), reprising the role that Pully had originated in the Broadway musical.
 Lee J. Cobb as Rico Angelo in Party Girl (1958)
 George Raft as Spats Colombo and Nehemiah Persoff as Little Bonaparte in Some Like It Hot (1959)
 Cameron Mitchell as Boss Rojeck in My Favorite Year (1982)
 Harvey Atkin as "Al Koopone" (King Koopa) in The Super Mario Bros. Super Show episode "The Unzappables" (1989)
 Al Pacino as Alphonse "Big Boy" Caprice in Dick Tracy (1990)
Maurice LaMarche as Owl Capone in the TaleSpin episode "My Fair Baloo" (1991).

Music
 Prince Buster, Jamaican ska and rocksteady musician, had his first hit in the UK with the single "Al Capone" in 1967.
 The British pop group Paper Lace's 1974 hit song "The Night Chicago Died" mentions that "a man named Al Capone, tried to make that town his own, and he called his gang to war, with the forces of the law".
 British rock band Queen referenced Al Capone in the opening of their 1974 song "Stone Cold Crazy", which was covered in 1990 by the American rock band Metallica.
 In 1979, The Specials, a UK ska revival group, reworked Prince Buster's track into their first single, "Gangsters", which featured the line "Don't call me Scarface!"
 Al Capone is referenced heavily in Prodigy's track "Al Capone Zone", produced by The Alchemist and featuring Keak Da Sneak.
 "Al Capone" is a song by Michael Jackson. Jackson recorded the song during the Bad era (circa 1987), but it wasn't included on the album though he did rework it into the song "Smooth Criminal" which did get on the album and was one of Jackson's most popular songs. "Al Capone" was  released in September 2012 in celebration of the album's 25th anniversary. By that point, Jackson had died in 2009 and so did not see the release of "Al Capone" during his lifetime.
Chicago 1945 is a song recorded in 1982 by Michael Jackson, it is currently unreleased and mentions Al Capone in its lyrics.
 Brazilian musician Raul Seixas has a song entitled "Al Capone", included in his 1973 debut album Krig-ha, Bandolo!.
 Multiple hip hop artists have adopted the name "Capone" for their stage names including: Capone, Mr. Capone-E and Al Kapone.
 The R&B Vocal Group The Fantastic Four recorded a song entitled "Alvin Stone:(the Birth & Death Of A Gangster)" in 1975 from their album of the same name. The main protagonist was a gangster with a name very similar to Al Capone 
Chicago outsider musician Wesley Willis' track "Al Capone" is about the crime boss. In the song, Willis claims Capone "gunned down his brother" and "stole his hot rod", as well as "beat two men to death with a baseball bat". The song was to be on the unreleased album "My Friend Reza" but can be found on the "Greatest Hits, Volume 2" compilation album.
 In 2013, Capone was portrayed by EpicLLOYD in an episode of the humorous internet show Epic Rap Battles of History.
Chilean rapper Bronko Yotte includes a song in his album Fuero Interno (2020) called "Al Capone".
Rapper LL Cool J referenced Capone in the second verse of his song "The Boomin' System" from his 1990 release Mama Said Knock You Out.

Sports

 Fans of Serbian football club Partizan are using Al Capone's character as a mascot for one of their subgroups called "Alcatraz", named after a prison in which Al Capone served his sentence. Also, in honour of Capone, a graffiti representation of him exists in the center of Belgrade.
 Ultimate Fighting Championship light heavyweight Nikita Krylov was nicknamed "Al Capone". Coincidentally, he had his first UFC win in Chicago.

References

Al Capone
Crime in popular culture